Jozef Kovalík (born 4 November 1992) is a Slovak tennis player playing mostly on the ATP Challenger Tour. His highest ATP singles ranking was No. 80 reached on 22 October 2018, while his highest doubles ranking was No. 245 reached on 2 April 2018.

Career

2010-2014: First Challenger title 
Kovalík together with Filip Horanský won bronze medal in doubles at 2010 Summer Youth Olympics.

He won his first Challenger title on 17 August 2014, after beating second seed Andrey Kuznetsov. He became the fourth player to win an ATP Challenger title while ranked outside the top 300.

2016: ATP debut
He played his first match at ATP level on 5 January 2016 in Chennai, where he lost in the first round.

He played his first match at a Grand Slam on 18 January 2016 at the Australian Open, where he lost to fellow qualifier Marco Trungelliti in the first round.

At the 2016 BNP Paribas Open Kovalík won his first match at ATP level, defeating another qualifier Pierre-Hugues Herbert in the first round. He lost in two tight tie-breaks in the subsequent round, to fellow up-and-coming talent Dominic Thiem. Despite the loss his tennis was of an extremely high quality. Kovalík was able to win cheap points off his first serve, utilised an effective kicking second serve, and consistently hit his groundstrokes with great accuracy, power and depth. In addition he remained mentally composed on key points and played intelligent tennis throughout. During the match he was watched by fellow Slovak and coach of Novak Djokovic, Marian Vajda. Kovalík won the 2016 Capri Watch Cup, his second title on the ATP Challenger Tour.

2018: Top 100
At the 2018 Sofia Open he had his best ATP tournament, reaching the semifinals and losing to Marius Copil in straight sets, 6–4, 6–2. Kovalík reached another ATP level semifinal at 2018 German Open in Hamburg, where he lost to the defending champion Leonardo Mayer. After this tournament Kovalík moved into Top 100 for the first time.

Performance timelines

Singles 
Current through the 2022 Qatar ExxonMobil Open.

Doubles 
Current through the 2022 Melbourne Summer Set 1.

Challenger and Futures finals

Singles 25 (14–11)

Doubles

Wins over top 10 players

References

External links 
 
 
 
 
 
 

1992 births
Living people
Tennis players from Bratislava
Slovak male tennis players
Tennis players at the 2010 Summer Youth Olympics
21st-century Slovak people